Fenadiazole, also known as phénadiazole and sold under the brand names Hypnazol, Eudormil, and Viodor, is a hypnotic and sedative medication which has been used to treat insomnia but is no longer marketed. It is described as a non-barbiturate hypnotic with marked or profound hypnotic and sedative properties in animals, variable hypnotic effects in humans (rapidly inducing sleep for 6 to 8hours), additional anticonvulsant, antithermal, and spasmolytic effects, and a generally well-tolerated profile in humans (at an average dosage of 200mg/day). The drug was synthesized, pharmacologically characterized, patented, and marketed by the French pharmaceutical company Laboratoires Jacques Logeais between 1960 and 1962. As a hypnotic and sedative, fenadiazole has a unique oxadiazole-based chemical structure. It may be chemically related to certain other hypnotics and sedatives with atypical chemical structures.

References

Drugs with unknown mechanisms of action
Hypnotics
Oxadiazoles
Phenols
Sedatives